Silent Drive is an American post-hardcore band from Worcester, Massachusetts, United States. The band was formed from members of Ink Cartridge Funeral, Bane, Dasai, and Drowningman. The band was signed to Equal Vision Records, and toured Internationally in the US, UK, Japan, Europe, and Canada both before and after the release of their 2004 album, Love is Worth It.

The song "4/16" appeared on the soundtrack of the game Burnout 3 by EA Games.

In November 2021, the band announced via Facebook their new album, Fairhaven, which was released on Equal Vision in June 2022.

Current line-up 
Zach Jordan - vocals (2003–present)
Nick Van Someren - guitar (2003–present)
Pete Chilton - bass  (2003–present)
Dave Joyal - drums (2003–present)

Past line-up 
Andy Kyte - guitar (2003)
Nick Branigan - drums (2003)

Discography 
Rock H Design (2003) demo
 Love Is Worth It (2004)
 Fairhaven (2022)

References

External links

Silent Drive on Equal Vision Records

American post-hardcore musical groups
Musical groups from Massachusetts
Musical groups from Worcester, Massachusetts
Musical groups established in 2003
Equal Vision Records artists
2003 establishments in Massachusetts